The Samsung Galaxy A7  (2017) (or Samsung Galaxy A7 2017 Edition) is an Android high to midrange smartphone produced by Samsung Electronics. It was announced on January 2, 2017, along with Samsung Galaxy A3 (2017) and Samsung Galaxy A5 (2017). This move marks Samsung's first product launch since the discontinuation of the Galaxy Note 7 back in October 2016.

The Samsung Galaxy A7 (2017) runs Android 6.0.1 Marshmallow out-of-the-box and runs on Grace UX interface (and upgradable to Android 7.0 "Nougat" and Android 8.0 "Oreo" with Samsung Experience 8.1 and 9.0 respectively). The smartphone features an Exynos 7880 SoC consisting of 8 ARM Cortex-A53 backed by the Mali-T830MP3 GPU and sports 3 GB of RAM and 32 GB of internal storage, expandable to 256 GB via a MicroSD card slot. Unlike the previous version of the A7, it has a dedicated MicroSD card slot allowing both a second SIM Card in dual SIM models and MicroSD card to be used at the same time.

The device retains a non-removable battery like its predecessor, rated at 3600mAh with fast-charging capabilities. Its extra features, similar to Samsung's 2016 flagship's, include IP68 water resistance, Always-on Display, and 3D glass backing with Gorilla Glass 4. A new "Always On display" functionality displays a clock, calendar, and notifications on-screen when the device is in standby.
The Samsung A7 2017 has started  receive the latest and last Android 8.0 Oreo update in 2018.

Availability
Following the unveiling, Samsung announced that they will sell up to 20 million smartphones, targeting CIS, Africa, Asia, and Latin America. Unlike its predecessors, the Galaxy A7 (2017) will not be coming to the United States, Western and Central Europe as well as Caucasus countries and China.

While Samsung Galaxy A7 (2015) had broader availability in Europe, this model was never sold in that region because it was being deemed too expensive and also due to near-direct competition against Samsung Galaxy S7. Samsung will instead sell the Samsung Galaxy A3 (2017) and Samsung Galaxy A5 (2017) to these countries instead.

Variants

References

Samsung galaxy 2013

Android (operating system) devices
Samsung Galaxy
Samsung smartphones
Mobile phones introduced in 2017
Discontinued smartphones